Hershel B. "Cutter" Northcutt was an American football and basketball coach and college athlete.

College athlete
As a college athlete at the Vanderbilt University, Northcutt was part of the 1915 squad that won the 1915 SIAA conference championship under head coach Dan McGugin.

College coach
Northcutt then spent time as the head football coach at Columbia Military Academy in Columbia, Tennessee before becoming the head football and women's basketball coach at Hendrix College in Conway, Arkansas for two seasons.

Head coaching record

References

Year of birth missing
Year of death missing
Hendrix Warriors football coaches
Vanderbilt Commodores football players
College women's basketball coaches in the United States